Wheatley is a crater on Venus at latitude 16.6, longitude 268 in Asteria Regio. It is 74.8 km in diameter and was named after Phillis Wheatley, the first black writer of note in America (1753-1784).

References 

Impact craters on Venus